Filippos Pliatsikas (Greek: Φίλιππος Πλιάτσικας) is a Greek musician, composer and lyricist. He was the main composer, lyricist, and lead singer of the Entekhno rock group Pyx Lax (Πυξ Λαξ) and now a solo artist.

Career 
Filippos Pliatsikas was born in Athens and has been involved in music from the age of 12.
From 1989 he was a founding member of the most popular band in Greece “PIX LAX” and until 2004 when the band broke up, he wrote and sang songs like “I Palies Agapes Pane Sto Paradiso”, “Monaxia Mou Ola” “Epapses Agapi Na Thimizis” and many more. His solo career since 2004 has been equally impressive and his albums continue to reach gold and platinum sales. Songs like “Ti Den Emathe O Theos”, “Taxidevontas Me Allo Ixo- recorded from the live performance from Athens Concert Hall “Megaron” with the ERT classical orchestra of Contemporary Music, “Ena Vrochero Taxi”, the album “Omnia” which included tracks like “Pyos Exi Logo Stin Agapi”, “An Tha Borousa To Kosmo Na Allaza”, “Poli Chioni” and more.

On his musical journey he has collaborated with artists like R.E.M., Sting, Eric Burdon, Marc Almond, Steve Wynn, Gordon Gano, Loop Guru, I Muvrini, Haroula Alexiou, Haris and Panos Katsimihas, Dionisis Tsaknis, Vasilis Kazoulis, Vasilis Karas, Lavrentis Mahairitsas, Dimitris Mitropanos and many more. Filippos has appeared in many concerts both in Greece and abroad and continues to do so.
In 2005 & 2006 he collaborated with Lavrentis Mahairitsas and Dionusis Tsaknis in shows all over Greece. This two-year collaboration ended with a big show called “25 years – Our Rock” with guests from all the most important singers in the industry. In the summer of 2006, Filippos took part in a road festival called “Oniro Electricis Nychtas” travelled all over Greece with Manolis Famellos, ONAR, Theodoris Kontakos (Kos K).

In the spring of 2007, Filippos released one of his most successful albums to date in his personal career called “Omnia”. This platinum album put Filippos in a higher league in terms of his live performances. This was seen in his three sold out concerts with the Contemporary Orchestra of ERT in Greece’s renowned Lycabettus theatre where 22.000 fans justify his journey and choice. In the winter of 2008, he toured all over Greece and Cyprus with Vasilis Kazoulis where more than 100.000 fans attend these successful shows.

In 2009 he releasesd his next album “Ballerinas Epitreponte” and he toured in 10 European cities: London, Leicester, Düsseldorf, Frankfurt, Stuttgart, Munich, Brussels, Amsterdam, Nicosia and Lemesos. In the same year he kicked off his summer tour in the Karaiskaki Stadium with Sinead O'Connor and guest starring: Kostis Maraveyas, Gordon Gano (Violent Femmes) and MC Yinka. At the end of 2010, he released his album “Tin Alitheia Na Po” which was distributed for free via the internet, something done for the first time in the Greek music industry. This album included 15 tracks which portrayed his truth, his reality. He experimented with various sounds and by using a Gospel choir from San Diego mixed with musicians from Ipirus he managed to make his songs a journey once again. In light of the album he performed shows in December 2010 to the spring of 2011.

In 2011, Pyx Lax reunited. These old friends reunited on stage for a series of shows. This was considered the music event of the year. They travelled to the biggest cities in Greece and presented a show unlike one ever performed in Greece before. This was the case as it broke the record of the most ticket sales ever sold by Greek artists. The highlights of the tour were in the Olympic Stadium in Athens which had an audience of 80.000 people and in the Kaftanzoglio Stadium in Thessaloniki with an audience of 50.000 people. The Pix Lax tour came to an end with three shows in America (New York, Chicago, Boston) and one in Canada (Toronto) which were performed in historic venues (Terminal 5 and House of Blues).

In March 2012, Filippos released his new album titled “Prosochii sto Keno”and the song “Pou na pame” has already started its own journey. Filippos is currently getting ready for his summer tour which starts on 30 May and Eleonora Zouganeli will also be performing with him.

Discography

Personal Albums 

 Ena Vrochero Taxi - A Rainy Taxi – 2002 
 Ti Den Emathe O Theos - What God Did Not Learn – 2005
 Taxidevontas Me Allon Icho - Travelling With Another Sound – 2006 
 Omnia - Everything – 2007 
 Ballarines Epitreponte - Ballerinas Are Allowed – 2009 
 Tin Alithia Na Po - To Tell The Truth – 2010 
 Prosoxi Sto Keno - Mind The Gap – 2012

PYX-LAX Albums 

 Ti Allo Na Pis Pio Apla – 1990 
 Zoriky Kery – 1991 
 O Ilios Tou Chimona Me Melancholi 
 Gia Tous Prinkipes Tis Dytikis Ochthis 
 O Baboulas Tragoudai Monos Tis Nychtes 
 Nihterinos Peripatos Stin Iera Odo – 1997 – With Giorgos Dalaras 
 Live Recording from Iera Odo – 1997 – With George Dalaras 
 Paixe Paliatso Ta Tragoudia Sou Telionoun – 1997 
 O Erotas Koimithike Noris – 1998 
 Stilvi – 1998 
 Ase tin Ikona Na Milai – 1999 – with I Muvrini/ Featuring Sting 
 Netrino – 1999 with Lakis Papadopoulos 
 Iparhoun Chrisopsara Edo? – 1999 
 Ta Dokaria Sto Grasidi Perimenoun Ta Pedia – 2001 
 Apo Edo Ki Apo Ki – 2002 
 Charoumeny Stin Poli Ton Trelon – 2003 
 Telos – Live from Lykabettus – 2004 
 Hey Man Kyta Brosta – Live – 2011

References

External links
Official website

Living people
Greek rock singers
Greek entehno singers
Greek songwriters
MAD Video Music Awards winners
Modern Greek-language singers
Singers from Athens
Year of birth missing (living people)